The Huizhu Lu (揮麈錄; "Records of Waving a Duster") is a 12th-century (or early 13th-century) biji-style Chinese history book written by the Song dynasty scholar Wang Mingqing (王明清) who wrote the book over a period of 30 years. Focusing mainly on the fall of the Northern Song dynasty (Jingkang incident) of 1127 and the restoration of the dynasty, the book contains a lot of information on the functioning of the imperial court.

It contains 4 sections:
"Former Records" (前錄), 4 chapters
"Latter Records" (後錄), 11 chapters
"Three Records" (三錄), 3 chapters
"Addendum" (餘話), 2 chapters

References

Further reading

12th-century history books
Chinese history texts
Song dynasty literature
12th-century Chinese books